In statistical analysis of time series and in signal processing, directional symmetry is a statistical measure of a model's performance in predicting the direction of change, positive or negative, of a time series from one time period to the next.

Definition
Given a time series  with values  at times  and a model that makes predictions for those values , then the directional symmetry (DS) statistic is defined as

Interpretation
The DS statistic gives the percentage of occurrences in which the sign of the change in value from one time period to the next is the same for both the actual and predicted time series. The DS statistic is a measure of the performance of a model in predicting the direction of value changes. The case  would indicate that a model perfectly predicts the direction of change of a time series from one time period to the next.

See also
Statistical finance

Notes and references 
 Drossu, Radu, and Zoran Obradovic. "INFFC data analysis: lower bounds and testbed design recommendations." Computational Intelligence for Financial Engineering (CIFEr), 1997., Proceedings of the IEEE/IAFE 1997. IEEE, 1997.
 Lawrance, A. J., "Directionality and Reversibility in Time Series", International Statistical Review, 59 (1991), 67–79.
 Tay, Francis EH, and Lijuan Cao. "Application of support vector machines in financial time series forecasting." Omega 29.4 (2001): 309–317.
 Xiong, Tao, Yukun Bao, and Zhongyi Hu. "Beyond one-step-ahead forecasting: Evaluation of alternative multi-step-ahead forecasting models for crude oil prices." Energy Economics 40 (2013): 405–415.

Symmetry
Signal processing